Halcyon Place Historic District is a national historic district located at Yonkers, Westchester County, New York. It includes 12 contributing buildings.  They are residential structures representative of the Queen Anne and turn of the 20th century revival styles, including Classical Revival.  They were built between 1901 and 1924 and developed as a planned, middle-class  suburban development.

It was added to the National Register of Historic Places in 1991.

References

External links

Halcyon Place Historic District Map (LivingPlaces.com)

Houses on the National Register of Historic Places in New York (state)
Historic districts on the National Register of Historic Places in New York (state)
Neoclassical architecture in New York (state)
Queen Anne architecture in New York (state)
Buildings and structures in Yonkers, New York
Houses in Westchester County, New York
National Register of Historic Places in Yonkers, New York
Historic districts in Yonkers, New York